The 2019–2020 session was a session of the California State Legislature. The session first convened on December 3, 2018 and adjourned sine die on November 30, 2020.

Major events

Vacancies and special elections 
January 7, 2019: Republican senator Ted Gaines (1st–El Dorado Hills) resigns to take a seat on the California State Board of Equalization while Democratic Senator Ricardo Lara (33rd–Bell Gardens) resigns to become California Insurance Commissioner.
June 12, 2019: Republican assemblymember Brian Dahle and Democratic Councilwoman Lena Gonzalez (Long Beach) is sworn into office after winning June 4 special elections for the 1st Senate district to replace Gaines (Dahle) and the 33rd Senate district to replace Lara (Gonzalez).
November 12, 2019: Republican Megan Dahle is sworn into office after winning the special election for the 1st Assembly district to replace Brian Dahle.
October 30, 2019: Republican senator Jeff Stone (28th–La Quinta) resigns to become the Western Regional Director of the United States Department of Labor. Republican Melissa Melendez won a special election on May 12, 2020 and succeeded Stone on May 18. She resigned from California's 67th State Assembly district.

Leadership changes 
 January 7, 2019: Democrat Eleni Kounalakis, a former U.S. Ambassador to Hungary, is sworn in as Lieutenant Governor (and Senate President), replacing Gavin Newsom, who termed out but was elected Governor.
 March 1, 2019: Republican senator Shannon Grove (16th–Bakersfield) replaces senator Patricia Bates (36th–Laguna Niguel) as Senate minority leader

Party changes 
January 24, 2019: Assemblymember Brian Maienschein (77th–San Diego) changed party affiliation from Republican to Democratic.
December 5, 2019: Assemblymember Chad Mayes (42nd–Yucca Valley) left the Republican Party to sit as an Independent.

State Senate

Officers 

The Secretary, the Sergeant-at-Arms, and the chaplain are not members of the Legislature.

Members

State Assembly

Officers 

The Chief Clerk, the acting Chief Sergeant-at-Arms, and the chaplain are not members of the Legislature.

Members

See also
 List of California state legislatures

References

External links 
 California State Senate
 California State Assembly

2019-20
2019 in California
2020 in California
California
California